Endless is the fifth studio album by Australian country band, the McClymonts, released in Australia on 13 January 2017 by Universal Records and peaking at No. 3 on the ARIA Albums Chart.

Mollie McClymonts commented on the album title saying "Endless reflects how we're feeling about our lives right now and our love and dedication to our family and also for music. We will be doing this forever – that's our plan."

At the 2018 Country Music Awards of Australia, Endless won awards for Country Music Album of the Year and Contemporary Country Album of the Year.

Track listing
 "Like We Used To"
 "House"
 "Nothing Good Comes Easy"
 "Endless"
 "Chain Smoker"
 "Let You Down"
 "When We Say It's Forever" (feat. Ronan Keating)
 "Unsaveable"
 "Judge You
 "Don't Wish It All Away"
 "Bad for Us"

Charts

Weekly Charts

Year-end charts

References 

2017 albums
The McClymonts albums